John de Burgh may refer to:

 John de Burgh (died 1271), son of Hubert de Burgh and son in law of William de Lanvallei
  John de Burgh (1286–1313), Irish heir apparent to the Earldom of Ulster
 John de Burgh, 13th Earl of Clanricarde (1744–1808), Irish nobleman, politician and cricketer
 John Smith (Burke) de Burgh, 11th Earl of Clanricarde (1720–1782), Irish peer
  John de Burgh (1590–1667), Roman Catholic archbishop of Tuam
 Jon de Burgh Miller (21st century), English science fiction writer

See also
John Burgh (disambiguation)